The 1872 Cork City by-election was fought on 6 December 1872.  The byelection was fought due to the death of the incumbent MP of the Liberal Party, John Francis Maguire.  It was won by the Home Rule candidate Joseph Philip Ronayne.

References

Elections in Cork (city)
By-elections to the Parliament of the United Kingdom in County Cork constituencies
1872 elections in the United Kingdom
1872 elections in Ireland